One of the oldest churches in its area, St Mary's was consecrated on 19 August 1283 by Bishop of Worcester, Godfrey Giffard. It is believed that most of the church as it is today was completed in 1325, some 171 years after its first recorded vicar, Gerinus, in 1154. It is one of four churches in the town of Wotton-under-Edge in Gloucestershire.

Layout

Sacristy
The sacristy was built in the 1830s and contains charity boards that were originally from the galleries, located at the west end of the church. The sacristy contains clothing for the acolytes and minister, as well as other items used within the service.

Sanctuary
The roof over the sanctuary is all that remains of the 16th century roof that covered the nave. The reredos (a more recent part of this church) is made from English Oak in 14th Century style to blend in with the historic image of the rest of the church, in memory of Charlotte Sewell, mother of vicar Canon Sewell (1882–1902).
The East Window dates back to the completion of the church in 1325, depicting angels and saints in adoration of Christ.

Brasses
This is the area near the sacristy containing the tombs of Lord Thomas IV and Lady Berkeley. Lord Thomas was the Admiral of the King's Fleet and fought in the battle of Agincourt. . The brasses over their tombs date from 1392 and are thus the second oldest in Gloucestershire.

Chancel & Choir
The choir stalls were built into the church in 1885, the incredible chandelier that swings above was a gift from clothier William Moore, in 1763 - but is only lit at major events.

The Catherine Chapel
The Catharine Chapel is located at the top of the north aisle. It is named after St Catherine, not to be confused with Lady Berkeley. The chapel was originally built in medieval times, possibly not long after the actual church. It was enlarged in 1780 to form a vestry and then restored as a chapel in 1928. It is now used for Friday morning prayer.

Tower
The church tower is located at the west of the church. It was built in six stages, the first two in c.1320, at the time of the church construction. The latter four were built slightly later but completed by the end of the 14th Century. It stands 47 metres tall.

Clock
Built in 1902, the clock is about halfway up the west side of the tower, with a clock face measuring six feet in diameter. The hands and numbers are made from brass.

Bells
The bells were originally cast in 1756 in Gloucester by Abel Rudhall. In 1902, during a renovation of the tower (including the clock), they were hung on steel frames, and then rehung again in 1960. They sound in the key of E-flat.

The Organ

The church is perhaps best known for its large organ. Positioned in the south-east corner of the church, adjacent to the altar; it is one of the biggest organs in the county and is famed for having been played by Georg Handel when in its previous location of St Martin in the Fields.
The organ was presented to St Martin in the Fields by King George I It possesses a large range of stops over three manuals and a pedalboard, including two trumpets, six diapasons, a cornopean, and a flute

A specification of the organ can be found on the National Pipe Organ Register.

References

Wotton-under-Edge
Diocese of Gloucester
Grade II listed churches in Gloucestershire
Wotton-under-Edge